Virginijus Sinkevičius (born 4 November 1990) is a Lithuanian politician who has been serving as European Commissioner for the Environment, Oceans and Fisheries in the European Commission led by Ursula von der Leyen since 2019. He previously was a Member of the Seimas of the Republic of Lithuania and Minister of the Economy and Innovation of the Republic of Lithuania.

Early life and education
In 2009, Sinkevičius graduated from Salomėja Nėris Gymnasium of Vilnius, Lithuania, where he was born. He then pursued his undergraduate studies in Aberystwyth University from where he received a Bachelor of Economic and Social Studies degree in 2012.

In 2012, Sinkevičius was a trainee in the Unit of Regional and Ethnic Affairs at the Office of the Prime Minister of the Republic of Lithuania. In 2013, he received a Master of Arts in European Studies from Maastricht University.

Sinkevičius speaks Lithuanian as mother tongue, as well as English, Russian and Polish.

Early career
In 2012–2015, Sinkevičius was an author and editor of the news portal Lithuania Tribune. In 2013–2014, he served as an assistant project manager at the Centre for European Policy Analysis (CEPA) in Washington, D.C.

In 2014, Sinkevičius worked as an international group project manager in Lietuvos paštas; in 2014–2015, he participated in the ‘Create Lithuania’ program. In 2015–2016, he was the project coordinator in the concession project of the Lithuanian Airports (LTOU). In 2016, he was a team leader of the Group for Improving the Investment Environment in Public Enterprise Invest Lithuania.

In 2017, Sinkevičius completed Digital Policy course in University of Oxford.

Political career

Career in national politics
In the 2016 parliamentary elections, Sinkevičius was elected to the Seimas of the Republic of Lithuania in the single-member as an independent candidate Šeškinė constituency in Vilnius; he was then appointed Chair of the Committee on Economic Affairs.

On 27 November 2017, Sinkevičius was appointed Minister of Economy in the cabinet of Prime Minister Saulius Skvernelis and, following the reorganization of the Ministry of Economy, he became Minister of the Economy and Innovation.

European Commissioner
On 22 August 2019, the Lithuanian parliament approved Sinkevičius’ nomination for European commissioner; the nomination was agreed upon by Prime Minister Skvernelis and Ramūnas Karbauskis, the leader of the Lithuanian Farmers and Greens Union (LVŽS).

Upon taking office, Sinkevičius became the youngest-ever European Commissioner, at the age of 28.

In 2022, Sinkevičius proposed legally binding targets to halve the use of chemical pesticides and restore nature across the EU to at least 20% of EU land by 2030, in an attempt to better protect health and recover plunging wildlife populations.

Recognition
In 2018, Sinkevičius was awarded for The Best Solution for Better Business Environment of the Year by the association Investors’ Forum, and Blockchain Leadership at #SWITCH! Tech Awards. In 2019, he received the Partnership Leader 2018 award for innovation reform and development of startup ecosystem from the organisation Lithuanian Business Confederation. In 2018, Sinkevičius was included in the list of 100 World’s Most Influential Young People in Government by the website Apolitical.

References

External links 
 Virginijus Sinkevičius, European Commission

1990 births
Alumni of Aberystwyth University
Lithuanian European Commissioners
Lithuanian Farmers and Greens Union politicians
Living people
Maastricht University alumni
Members of the Seimas
Ministers of Economy of Lithuania
European Commissioners 2019–2024